Labor Games is a game show on TLC, hosted by Lisa Arch, that allows parents to answer questions to win prizes for their child while they are in labor. The top prize is a $10,000 college scholarship for the newborn baby.

Broadcast history
After a preview episode aired on TLC in April 2015, Labor Games premiered on September 15, 2015, with two episodes airing at 7 pm ET. However, TLC pulled the show the following week for Cake Boss. The show now airs at 7 pm ET Thursdays on Discovery Life.

References

TLC (TV network) original programming
2010s American game shows
2015 American television series debuts